Flag of Saint Martin may refer to:
Flag of Sint Maarten
Flag of the Collectivity of Saint Martin